Trifolium tembense, the Tembien clover or African clover, is a species of flowering plant in the family Fabaceae, found in Eritrea, Ethiopia, Democratic Republic of the Congo, Rwanda, Uganda, Kenya, and Tanzania. A locally important forage species, it prefers wet areas, often growing in shallow water.

References

tembense
Forages
Flora of Eritrea
Flora of Ethiopia
Flora of the Democratic Republic of the Congo
Flora of Rwanda
Flora of East Tropical Africa
Plants described in 1839